Mr. Zhao is a 1998 Chinese dark comedy film. It is the directorial debut of Lü Yue, already a well-established cinematographer for director Zhang Yimou.

Mr. Zhao tells the story of a philandering doctor living in Shanghai. His infidelity gets the best of him, however, when his mistress Tian Jing (Chen Yinan) announces she is pregnant, while his wife learns of his affair but refuses to grant a divorce.

Cast 
 Shi Jingming as the titular Mr. Zhao, a teacher of Chinese medicine.
 Zhang Zhihua as his wife, a factory worker.
 Chen Yinan as Tian Jing, his student and now pregnant mistress.

Reception 
Mr. Zhao won the 1998 Golden Leopard at the Locarno International Film Festival in Switzerland.

The film was also entered into competition at the 1999 Hong Kong International Film Festival and the 1998 AFI Fest in Los Angeles.

References

External links 

Mr. Zhao at the Chinese Movie Database

1998 films
Chinese comedy films
1990s Mandarin-language films
1998 comedy-drama films
Films set in Shanghai
Golden Leopard winners
Films directed by Lu Yue
1998 directorial debut films